Erigeron barbellulatus, commonly known as shining fleabane, is a species of fleabane in the family Asteraceae.

Distribution
The small plant is endemic to northeastern California, in the Sierra Nevada, from Lassen County south to Tulare County.

Description
Erigeron barbellulatus is a small perennial herb up to 15 cm (6 inches) tall.

One plant usually produces only one flower head, with 15–35 white, lavender, or blue ray florets surrounding numerous small disc florets.

References

External links

Calflora Database: Erigeron barbellulatus (Shining daisy, Shining fleabane)
Jepson eFlora (TJM2) treatment of Erigeron barbellulatus
USDA Plants profile for Erigeron barbellulatus (shining fleabane)
 UC Photos gallery: Erigeron barbellulatus

barbellulatus
Endemic flora of California
Flora of the Sierra Nevada (United States)
Plants described in 1895
Flora without expected TNC conservation status